Antrimpos is an extinct genus of crustacean which existed during the Triassic and Jurassic periods. It contains 15 species, including Antrimpos speciosus.

References

Penaeidae
Triassic crustaceans
Jurassic crustaceans
Prehistoric life of Europe
Triassic first appearances
Jurassic extinctions